David A. Hesser (January 1884 – February 13, 1908) was an American water polo player and swimmer who represented the United States at the 1904 Summer Olympics in St. Louis, Missouri.

At the 1904 Olympics, Hesser was sponsored by the New York Athletic Club, and was a member of the NYAC Olympic water polo team that won the gold medal in the event.  He was also a member of the NYAC Olympic relay team in the men's 4x50-yard freestyle relay which finished fourth in the event final.

Hesser died in 1908, at the age of 24.

References

1884 births
1908 deaths
American male water polo players
Olympic gold medalists for the United States in swimming
Olympic medalists in water polo
Olympic water polo players of the United States
Water polo players at the 1904 Summer Olympics
Medalists at the 1904 Summer Olympics
Swimmers at the 1904 Summer Olympics